Glen Sword (born 10 November 1967) is a male British former cyclist.

Cycling career
He competed at the 1988 Summer Olympics and the 1992 Summer Olympics.

He represented England in the scratch race and won a bronze medal in the 4,000 metres team pursuit, at the 1990 Commonwealth Games in Auckland, New Zealand.

References

External links
 

1967 births
Living people
British male cyclists
Olympic cyclists of Great Britain
Cyclists at the 1988 Summer Olympics
Cyclists at the 1992 Summer Olympics
Sportspeople from Liverpool
Commonwealth Games medallists in cycling
Commonwealth Games bronze medallists for England
Cyclists at the 1990 Commonwealth Games
Medallists at the 1990 Commonwealth Games